This is a list of Polish television related events from 2003.

Events
16 February - Krzysztof Zalewski wins the second series of Idol.

Debuts
23 January - Na Wspólnej (2003–present)

Television shows

1990s
Klan (1997–present)

2000s
M jak miłość (2000–present)
Idol (2002-2005)

Ending this year

Births

Deaths